Weightlifting was contested from September 2 to September 5 at the 1974 Asian Games in Aryamehr Weightlifting Hall, Tehran, Iran. Only in this edition a medal was awarded for each of the snatch and clean and jerk phases and for the combined total.

Medalists

Total

Snatch

Clean & jerk

Medal table

References

 New Straits Times, September 3–7, 1974
 sports123.com
  parssport.ir

 
1974 Asian Games events
1974
Asian Games
1974 Asian Games